"Krusty the Clown" is the eighth episode of the thirtieth season of the American animated television series The Simpsons, and the 647th episode overall. It aired in the United States on Fox on November 25, 2018.

Plot
When the school newspaper starts losing money, Principal Skinner appoints a new editor who demotes Lisa to TV recapper. She soon realizes Homer has a talent for summarizing shows and gives him the job. Homer is successful, but his bad reviews of Krusty the Clown's TV show causes Krusty to become enraged, and he tries to run Homer off the road. With Bart's help, Krusty hides out in a low-budget circus, where he finds happiness as a traditional clown. When the circus goes bankrupt, Krusty bails them out, but is ostracized by the circus people as a TV clown. He returns to TV after being acquitted by a Homer-hostile jury.

Homer's constant recapping causes friction in his marriage and he quits. A TV executive tries to keep Homer on the job, explaining that many of the shows out there don't really exist, but the networks promote them just for the buzz. Homer and Lisa expose the fraud in the school paper, but the article is cancelled and replaced by clickbait.

Reception
Rodney Ho of the AJC gave the episode an A, stating "In the end, this episode gives aggrandized importance to TV recappers, which I appreciate. But to be honest, I am not certain this part of my job is [as] important as it used to be. Still, because this episode is about my job and I'm an easily manipulated journalistic narcissist, I give this episode an A!"

Tony Sokol of Den of Geek gave the episode 4.5 out of 5 points ranking, stating "'Krusty the Clown' is a great episode, good enough to be on season 4. It's funny, character-driven and dare I say it? Timely, as overused a word in reviewing as the use of the comic rule of three on The Simpsons."

Dennis Perkins of The A.V. Club gave the episode a B− ranking, stating "The Simpsons used to be, can be, and occasionally still is a razor-sharp and hilarious critic of pop culture itself, and 'Krusty The Clown' shows what happens when the show's creators swing and miss."

"Krusty the Clown" scored a 0.8 rating with a 3 share and was watched by 2.11 million people, making The Simpsons Fox's highest rated show of the night.

Ryan Koh was nominated for a Writers Guild of America Award for Outstanding Writing in Animation at the 71st Writers Guild of America Awards for his script to this episode.

References

External links
 

2018 American television episodes
The Simpsons (season 30) episodes
Television episodes directed by Matthew Faughnan
Works about clowns